Podol is a rural locality (a village) in Terebayevskoye Rural Settlement, Nikolsky District, Vologda Oblast, Russia. The population was 19 as of 2002.

Geography 
Podol is located 25 km northwest of Nikolsk (the district's administrative centre) by road. Vyrypayevo is the nearest rural locality.

References 

Rural localities in Nikolsky District, Vologda Oblast